Kõrveküla is a village in Tapa Parish, Lääne-Viru County, in northeastern Estonia.

Gallery

References

External links
Kõrveküla Holiday Centre
Jäneda Safari Center in Kõrveküla 

Villages in Lääne-Viru County